
Gmina Sarnaki is a rural gmina (administrative district) in Łosice County, Masovian Voivodeship, in east-central Poland.

The gmina contains part of the protected area called Podlasie Bug Gorge Landscape Park.

Villages
Gmina Sarnaki contains the villages and settlements of Binduga, Bonin, Bonin-Ogródki, Borsuki, Bużka, Chlebczyn, Chybów, Franopol, Grzybów, Hołowczyce-Kolonia, Horoszki Duże, Horoszki Małe, Klepaczew, Klimczyce, Klimczyce-Kolonia, Kózki, Mierzwice-Kolonia, Nowe Hołowczyce, Nowe Litewniki, Nowe Mierzwice, Płosków, Płosków-Kolonia, Raczki, Rozwadów, Rzewuszki, Serpelice, Stare Hołowczyce, Stare Litewniki, Stare Mierzwice, Terlików and Zabuże.

Neighbouring gminas
Gmina Sarnaki is bordered by the gminas of Konstantynów, Mielnik, Platerów, Siemiatycze and Stara Kornica.

References

Polish official population figures 2006

Sarnaki
Łosice County